= Akumade Kujaku no Hanashi Desu =

Japanese manga series

- First tankōbon volume cover

あくまでクジャクの話です。
- Genre: Romantic comedy
- Manga
- Written by: Motoki Koide
- Published by: Kodansha
- Imprint: Morning KC
- Magazine: Comic Days
- Original run: November 30, 2023 – present
- Volumes: 8

Akumade Kujaku no Hanashi Desu (あくまでクジャクの話です。; lit. "It's Just a Story about Peacocks.") is a Japanese manga series written and illustrated by Motoki Koide. It began serialization on Kodansha's Comic Days manga website in November 2023.

== Synopsis ==
After being dumped by his girlfriend for "not being manly enough", high school teacher Yakuro Kuji is in a depressed state. Overhearing his agony, high school student Akano comes in to ask Yakuro to become advisor to the Biology Club. In doing so, she also helps explain masculinity to Yakuro using the feathers of a peacock.

== Publication ==
Written and illustrated by Motoki Koide, Akumade Kujaku no Hanashi Desu began serialization on Kodansha's Comic Days manga website on November 30, 2023. Its chapters have been collected in eight tankōbon volumes as of August 2026.

No.	Release date	ISBN
1	April 10, 2024	978-4-06-535257-1
2	July 10, 2024	978-4-06-536204-4
3	November 13, 2024	978-4-06-537525-9
4	April 9, 2025	978-4-06-539181-5
5	August 12, 2025	978-4-06-540333-4
6	December 10, 2025	978-4-06-541979-3
7	April 8, 2026	978-4-06-543279-2
8	August 10, 2026	978-4-06-544734-5
9	December 9, 2026	978-4-06-546411-3

== Reception ==
The series was recommended by Real Sound writer Mei Chan.

The series was nominated for the tenth Next Manga Awards in the web category in 2024. The series topped the Nationwide Publishers Recommended Comics of 2025 list.
